The J. Ross Robertson Cup was a Canadian ice hockey trophy. It was awarded annually to the champion of the intermediate division in the Ontario Hockey Association from the 1898–99 season until the 1933–34 season. It was the second of three similarly named trophies donated by John Ross Robertson, which included the J. Ross Robertson Cup for the annual champions of the junior division, and the J. Ross Robertson Cup for the annual champions of senior division.

History

The J. Ross Robertson Cup was donated by John Ross Robertson in 1899, to be awarded annually to the champion of the intermediate division in the Ontario Hockey Association (OHA). Robertson served as president of the OHA from 1899 to 1905, had founded the Toronto Evening Telegram, helped establish The Hospital for Sick Children, and served as a member of the House of Commons of Canada for Toronto East. He was against professionalism in sports, and felt that "sport should be pursued for its own sake, for when professionalism begins, true sport ends".

The OHA began the intermediate division for the 1896–97 season. Intermediate division players were rated between the senior and junior divisions. The Kingston Frontenacs team coached by James T. Sutherland won the first J. Ross Robertson Cup awarded to the intermediate hockey division in 1899. The J. Ross Robertson Cup continued to be awarded the OHA intermediate champion until the division was discontinued in 1934.

The J. Ross Robertson Cup was the second of three similarly named trophies Robertson donated to the OHA, which included the J. Ross Robertson Cup for the annual champions of the junior division, and the J. Ross Robertson Cup for the annual champions of senior division.

List of cup winners

List of cup winners:

References

1898 establishments in Ontario
1934 disestablishments in Ontario
Awards established in 1898
Awards disestablished in the 1930s
Canadian ice hockey trophies and awards
Ontario Hockey Association